The Mohawk Valley Prowlers were a minor professional ice hockey based in Utica, New York, as a member of the United Hockey League (UHL) that played from 1998 to 2001. The Dayton Ice Bandits' franchise was purchased and relocated following the relocation of the Utica Blizzard in 1997. In February 2001, the team were forced to fold by the league in the middle of the 2000–01 season as the team was $2 million in debt, filed for Chapter 11 bankruptcy, and could not pay the players' wages leading to a player strike on February 11, 2001.

References

Ice hockey clubs established in 1998
Ice hockey clubs disestablished in 2001
Ice hockey teams in New York (state)
1998 establishments in New York (state)
2001 disestablishments in New York (state)